Frida Kern née Seitz (b. 9 March 1891, d. 23 Dec 1988) was an Austrian composer. She was born in Vienna and grew up in Linz, studying piano with Anna Zappa, and later at the Linz Music Academy with August Göllerich.

She married Max Kern in 1909 and began composing in 1911. In 1923 she entered the Vienna Academy where she studied composition with Franz Schmidt and conducting with Robert Heger. She continued her studies with Eusebius Mandyczewski and Alexander Wunderer, graduating in 1927. Kern established a women's orchestra which toured Europe and North Africa, and in 1942 took a teaching position at the music school in Vienna. In 1960 she was honored by the Austrian Republic. She died in Linz.

Works
Selected works include:
Die vier Geigerlein (Vier kleine Vortragsstucke) (1891–1988) For 4 violins
Flotenserenade op. 62 (1891–1988) For flute and piano
Scherzo (1891–1988) For Horn and Piano
Spanischer Tanz Nr. 1 aus op. 24 (1891–1988) For Bassoon and Piano or Violoncello and Piano
Vier Stucke fur Blaserquintett op. 25 (1891–1988) for Wind Quintet

Her music has been recorded and issued on CD, including:
Frida Kern

References

1891 births
1988 deaths
20th-century classical composers
Austrian classical composers
Austrian music educators
Musicians from Vienna
Women classical composers
Women music educators
20th-century women composers